Singapore participated in the 1974 Asian Games held in Tehran, Iran from 1 to 16 September 1974. Athletes from Singapore won overall 11 medals, including one gold and finished 13th in a medal table.

References

Nations at the 1974 Asian Games
1974
Asian Games